These are the results of the women's 100 metres event at the 1997 World Championships in Athletics in Athens, Greece.

Medalists

Records

Results

First round
2 August

Second round
2 August

Semifinals
3 August

Final
3 August

References
 Results
 IAAF

- Women's 100 Metres, 1997 World Championships In Athletics
100 metres at the World Athletics Championships
1997 in women's athletics